BluRadio was established in 1976 as Radio Vergante. It transmits from Massino Visconti in the Italian Province of Novara  and serves the majority of Northern Italy and Southern Switzerland.

It transmits on 102.2FM from San Salvatore as well as several other frequencies such as 88.50 fm, 94.35 fm, 102.9 fm, 101.5 fm and 99.8 fm to accommodate the population of the Italian Alps.

One of the shows of the radio was Rit Parade, hosted by writer and speaker Stefano Cilio, aired on Sundays at 3pm until July 2019.

References

External links
 http://www.bluradio.it  (Official site)

Radio stations in Italy